George Martin Odom (July 8, 1882 – July 29, 1964) was an American National Museum of Racing and Hall of Fame jockey and trainer in Thoroughbred horse racing. He is only one of two people to ever have won the Belmont Stakes as both a jockey and a trainer.

A native of Columbus, Georgia, at age fourteen George Odom galloped horses for future Hall of Fame trainer, William P. Burch. He began riding professionally at age fifteen and in 1899 at age sixteen, won his first race. He quickly made such an impression that an April 10, 1899, article in the Chicago Daily Tribune referred to him as another Tod Sloan. In June 1899, the eighty-seven-pound Odom, who was an early advocate of the short-stirrup riding manner used today, signed a contract to ride for W. C. Whitney for a salary of $10,000 a year with additional compensation on a sliding scale for winning and finishing in the money.

He rode at tracks in New York, New Orleans and the Benning Race Track in Washington, D.C. Among his major wins as a jockey, Odom rode Banastar to victory in the 1901 Metropolitan and Toboggan Handicaps. The best known of his mounts was future Hall of Fame inductee, Broomstick.

After just eight years as a jockey, George Odom retired from riding in 1905 with a 17.2 winning percentage. Widely respected, he had earned a reputation as an honest jockey in an era when race fixing was not uncommon. Odom then made his home in Atlanta, Georgia, and immediately turned to training horses.

As a trainer

George Odom made his debut as a trainer on August 30, 1906, at Sheepshead Bay Race Track in Brooklyn, New York. He owned and trained a colt name Oraculum, who won the 1906 Hempstead Stakes for two-year-olds at Jamaica Race Course. In 1907, Odom led all trainers in wins at Washington Park Race Track in Chicago.

During his career, George Odom operated a public stable whose clients over the years included Robert L. Gerry, Sr., Marshall Field III, and Hollywood film mogul Louis B. Mayer who owned Odom's most famous runner, Busher, a future Hall of Fame filly who was voted 1945 American Horse of the Year honors. Odom also trained good runners such as Nimba and Tippity Witchet. Having won the 1904 Belmont Stakes as the jockey aboard Delhi, when he won it as a trainer in 1938 with Pasteurized he joined James G. Rowe Sr. as the only ones to ever win that American Classic both as a jockey and as a trainer.

Following the formation of the National Museum of Racing and Hall of Fame, George Odom was part of the 1955 inaugural class of inductees.

Married to Julie Murtha in 1902, in later years the Odoms made their home in Jamaica, New York. A few weeks after his eighty-second birthday, George Odom died on July 29, 1964, at Roosevelt Hospital in Manhattan, New York. Their son, George P. "Maje" Odom, was also a trainer.

References

1882 births
1964 deaths
American jockeys
American horse trainers
United States Thoroughbred Racing Hall of Fame inductees
Sportspeople from Columbus, Georgia